Asiamoeba is a subgenus of the genus Plasmodium - all of which are parasitic unicellular eukaryotes. The subgenus was created by Telford in 1988. Species in this subgenus infect lizards.

Diagnostic features 

Species in the subgenus Asiamoeba have the following characteristics:

The schizonts and gametocytes are greatly disparate in size (4 to 15 times).

Species in this subgenus 
 Plasmodium draconis
 Plasmodium lionatum
 Plasmodium vastator

References 

Plasmodium subgenera